(born January 19, 1956), is a contemporary Western-style painter in Japan.

Life
Junpei Satoh was born in Kesennuma, Miyagi Prefecture, Japan, and began teaching himself oil painting at the age of 10. In 1974, he moved to Tokyo and attended Musashino Art University. After graduating from the plastic department where he studied oil painting in 1979, he got employment with a construction company.
 
From 1984 to 1989, Junpei worked as a part time art teacher in high schools and traveled to Australia in 1986. At professional schools in Sendai, he was a design and aesthetics instructor, and nominated as a member of TOKYOTEN in 1995. In 1999, Junpei edited an art book which discussed the history of art around the world. His works are characterized by portraits, coast landscapes and waves.

Books

Shows
 2005, 17th International Art Grand Prize Exhibition
 1995–present, Tokyo Exhibition
 1990, Solo Exhibition at the Miyagi Museum of Art
 1982, Solo Exhibition at the Tokyo Chyuo Gallery of Fine Arts, Ginza, Tokyo

External links
Official site in English
Official site in Japanese

Japanese painters
Contemporary painters
Living people
Artists from Miyagi Prefecture
1956 births